Un Poco Loco is an album by American jazz vibraphonist Bobby Hutcherson recorded in 1979 and released on the Columbia label. The album was Hutcherson's last for Columbia.

Reception
The Allmusic review by Scott Yanow awarded the album 4 stars stating "vibraphonist Bobby Hutcherson had evolved from a member of the avant-garde into a top exponent of the modern mainstream. This excellent album features Hutcherson with a top notch all-star group".

Track listing
All compositions by Bobby Hutcherson except as indicated
 "The Sailor's Song" (Steve George, John Lang, Jerry Manfedi, Richard Page) - 4:43 
 "Silver Hollow" (Jack DeJohnette) - 4:10 
 "Un Poco Loco" (Bud Powell) - 8:21 
 "Love Song" (George Cables) - 4:38 
 "Ivory Coast" (Red Young) - 4:29 
 "Ebony Moonbeams" (Cables) - 7:09 
 "I Wanna Stand over There" - 3:52 
Recorded at A&M Recording Studios, Los Angeles, California in 1979

Personnel
Bobby Hutcherson - vibes, marimba
George Cables - piano
John Abercrombie - guitar
Chuck Domanico - bass, electric bass
Peter Erskine - drums

References 

Columbia Records albums
Bobby Hutcherson albums
1979 albums